The Women of Brewster Place (1982) is the debut novel of American author Gloria Naylor. It won the National Book Award in category First Novel.
It was adapted as the 1989 miniseries The Women of Brewster Place and the 1990 television show Brewster Place by Oprah Winfrey's Harpo Productions.

The Women explores the lives of both men and women in an urban setting and examines relationships, both in terms of friendship and romantic love, including homosexual relationships.

In each of the "Seven Stories" of its subtitle, one or more of the seven women are involved with the main character of that particular story, such as Mattie appearing in Etta Mae's story or Kiswana showing up in Cora Lee's.

Plot summary

The women of Brewster Place are "hard-edged, soft-centered, brutally demanding, and easily pleased". Their names are Mattie Michael, Etta Mae Johnson, Lucielia "Ciel" Turner, Melanie "Kiswana" Browne, Cora Lee, Lorraine, and Theresa. Each of their lives are explored in several short stories. These short stories also chronicle the ups and downs many Black women face.

Musical adaptation
A new musical adaptation of The Women of Brewster Place was commissioned for the stage. The musical premiered at the Alliance Theatre in Atlanta, Georgia on September 12, 2007, the same theatre that also co-produced the show itself. It was directed by Molly Smith. The Women of Brewster Place toured several cities, opening to several positive reviews.

References

Sources
 Awkward, Michael. "Authorial Dreams of Wholeness: (Dis)Unity, (Literary) Parentage, and The Women of Brewster Place." Inspiriting Influences: Tradition, Revision, and Afro-American Women's Novels. New York: Columbia University Press, 1989. 97–134. Reprinted in Gloria Naylor: Critical Perspectives Past and Present.  Ed. Henry Louis Gates, Jr. and K. A. Appiah.  New York: Amistad, 1993. 37–70.
 Bobo, Jacqueline, and Ellen Seiter. "Black Feminism and Media Criticism: The Women of Brewster Place." Screen 32 (Autumn 1991): 286–302. Reprinted in Vision/Revision: Adapting Contemporary American Fiction Women to Film. Ed. Barbara Lupack.  Ohio: Popular, 1996. 145–57. Also reprinted in The Critical Response to Gloria Naylor. Ed. Sharon Felton and Michelle C. Loris.  Connecticut: Greenwood Press, 1997.  27–41.
 Christian, Barbara. "Naylor's Geography: Community, Class, and Patriarchy in The Women of Brewster Place and Linden Hills." Reading Black, Reading Feminist. Ed. Henry Louis Gates, Jr. New York: Meridian/Penguin, 1990. 348–73.
"No More Buried Lives: The Theme of Lesbianism in Audre Lorde's Zami, Gloria Naylor's The Women of Brewster Place, Ntozake Shange's Sassafras, Cypress, and Indigo, and Alice Walker's The Color Purple." Black Feminist Criticism. New York: Pergammon Press, 1985. 187–204.
Davis, Rocio G. "Identity in Community in Ethnic Short Story Cycles: Amy Tan's The Joy Luck Club, Louise Erdrich's Love Medicine, Gloria Naylor's The Women of Brewster Place." Ethnicity and the American Short Story. Ed. William E. Cain and Julia Brown. New York: Garland, 1997. 3–23.
Eko, Ebele. "Beyond the Myth of Confrontation: A Comparative Study of African and African-American Female Protagonists." Ariel 17 (October 1986): 139–52. Reprinted in The Critical Response to Gloria Naylor. Ed. Sharon Felton and Michelle C. Loris.  Connecticut: Greenwood Press, 1997. 13–22.
Fraser, Celeste. "Stealing B(l)ack Voices: The Myth of the Black Matriarchy and The Women of Brewster Place." Critical Matrix 5 (Fall/Winter 1989). Reprinted in Gloria Naylor: Critical Perspectives Past and Present.  ed. Henry Louis Gates, Jr. and K. A. Appiah.  New York: Amistad, 1993. 90–105.
Glickman, Marlaine. "Black Like Who?" Film Comment 25.3 (May/June 1989): 75–76. [Analysis of Oprah Winfrey's adaptation of The Women of Brewster Place for television.]
Kelly, Lori Duin. "The Dream Sequence in The Women of Brewster Place." Notes on Contemporary Literature 21 (September 1991): 8–10.
Matus, Jill L. "Dream, Deferral, and Closure in The Women of Brewster Place." Black American Literature Forum 24 (1990): 49–64. Reprinted in Gloria Naylor: Critical Perspectives Past and Present.  Ed. Henry Louis Gates, Jr. and K. A. Appiah.  New York: Amistad, 1993. 126–39.
Meisendhelder, Susan. "'Eating Cane' in Gloria Naylor's The Women of Brewster Place and Zora Neale Hurston's 'Sweat."' Notes on Contemporary Literature 23.2 (March 1993): 5–7.
Montgomery, Maxine L. "The Fathomless Dream: Gloria Naylor's Use of the Descent Motif in The Women of Brewster Place." CLA Journal 36.1 (1992): 1–11. Reprinted in The Critical Response to Gloria Naylor. Ed. Sharon Felton and Michelle C. Loris.  Connecticut: Greenwood Press, 1997. 42–8.
The Apocalypse in African-American Fiction. Gainesville: University Press of Florida, 1996.
Palumbo, Kathryn. "The Uses of Female Imagery in Naylor's The Women of Brewster Place." Notes on Contemporary Literature 15.3 (May 1985): 6–7.
Saunders, James Robert. "The Ornamentation of Old Ideas: Gloria Naylor's First Three Novels." Hollins Critic 27.2 (April 1990): 1–11. Reprinted in Gloria Naylor: Critical Perspectives Past and Present. Ed. Henry Louis Gates, Jr. and K. A. Appiah.  New York: Amistad, 1993. 249–62.
Stanford, Ann Folwell. "Mechanism of Disease: African-American Women Writers, Social Pathologies, and the Limits of Medicine." NWSA Journal 6.1 (Spring 1994): 24–47.
Tanner, Laura E. "Reading Rape: Sanctuary and The Women of Brewster Place." American Literature 62 (1990): 559–82. Reprinted in Gloria Naylor: Critical Perspectives Past and Present.  Ed. Henry Louis Gates, Jr. and K. A. Appiah.  New York: Amistad, 1993. 71–89.
Wardi, Anissa J. "The Scent of a Sugarcane: Recalling Cane in The Women of Brewster Place." College Language Association Journal 42.4 (1999): 483–507.
Wells, Linda, Sandra E. Bowen, and Suzanne Stutman. "'What Shall I Give My Children?': The Role of Mentor in Gloria Naylor's The Women of Brewster Place and Paule Marshall's Praisesong for the Widow." Explorations in Ethnic Studies 13.2 (1990): 41–60.

External links
 Powell's book review

1982 American novels
1982 debut novels
African-American novels
American novels adapted into films
Literature by African-American women
National Book Award-winning works
Northeastern United States in fiction
Novels by Gloria Naylor
Novels set in Tennessee
Viking Press books